The Southwestern Arkansas and Indian Territory Railroad was a railroad in the U.S. state of Arkansas in the late 19th century. The 10-mile-long,  narrow gauge line opened in July 1887 as an extension between Smithton and Hebron in Cleveland County, Arkansas.

The line was sold at foreclosure on 13 March 1900 after receivership was begun in March 1896, and reorganized on 28 April 1900 as the Arkansas Southwestern Railway Co.

References

3 ft gauge railways in the United States
Defunct Arkansas railroads